St. Helen's Church Stapleford is a parish church in the Church of England in Stapleford, Nottinghamshire.

The church is Grade II* listed by the Department for Digital, Culture, Media and Sport as it is a particularly significant building of more than local interest.

Stapleford cross in the churchyard is listed Grade I, and is also a scheduled ancient monument.

History

The church is medieval but was heavily restored in 1878 by T. G. Jackson.

Stone Cross

The churchyard contains a grade-I listed stone cross which dates from around AD1000. It was said by Pevsner to be "by far the most important pre-Conquest monument in Notts."

The cross may be the origin of the name 'Stapleford' which means a crossing near a post.

Memorials
Robert Tevery, died 1571
Gervase Tevery, died 1639
George John Borlase Warren, died 1801

Current parish status
St. Helen's Church Stapleford has a daughter church, St. Luke's Church Stapleford 
and also a church plant called Church @ Montrose Court.

References

Church of England church buildings in Nottinghamshire
Grade II* listed churches in Nottinghamshire